This is a list of official football games played by Iran national football team between 1980 and 1989.

1980
Friendly

Friendly

1980 AFC Asian Cup – Preliminary Round

1980 AFC Asian Cup – Preliminary Round

1980 AFC Asian Cup – Preliminary Round

1980 AFC Asian Cup – Preliminary Round

1980 AFC Asian Cup – Semifinal

1980 AFC Asian Cup – 3rd Place Match

1982
1982 Quaid-i-Azam International Cup

1982 Quaid-i-Azam International Cup

1982 Quaid-i-Azam International Cup

1982 Quaid-i-Azam International Cup

1982 Asian Games – Preliminary Round

1982 Asian Games – Preliminary Round

1982 Asian Games – Preliminary Round

1982 Asian Games – Quarterfinal

1984
1984 AFC Asian Cup Qualifier

1984 AFC Asian Cup Qualifier

1984 AFC Asian Cup Qualifier

1984 AFC Asian Cup Qualifier

1984 AFC Asian Cup Qualifier

1984 AFC Asian Cup Qualifier

1984 AFC Asian Cup – Preliminary Round

1984 AFC Asian Cup – Preliminary Round

1984 AFC Asian Cup – Preliminary Round

1984 AFC Asian Cup – Preliminary Round

1984 AFC Asian Cup – Semifinal

1984 AFC Asian Cup – 3rd Place Match

1985
1985 Nehru Cup – Preliminary Round

1985 Nehru Cup – Preliminary Round

Friendly

1986
1986 Fajr Cup – Preliminary Round

1986 Fajr Cup – Semifinal

Friendly

Friendly

1986 Asian Games – Preliminary Round

1986 Asian Games – Preliminary Round

1986 Asian Games – Preliminary Round

1986 Asian Games – Preliminary Round

1986 Asian Games – Quarterfinal

1988
1988 AFC Asian Cup Qualifier

1988 AFC Asian Cup Qualifier

1988 AFC Asian Cup Qualifier

1988 AFC Asian Cup Qualifier

1988 AFC Asian Cup – Preliminary Round

1988 AFC Asian Cup – Preliminary Round

1988 AFC Asian Cup – Preliminary Round

1988 AFC Asian Cup – Preliminary Round

1988 AFC Asian Cup – Semifinal

1988 AFC Asian Cup – 3rd Place Match

1989
Friendly

1990 FIFA World Cup Qualifier – First Round

1990 FIFA World Cup Qualifier – First Round

1990 FIFA World Cup Qualifier – First Round

1990 FIFA World Cup Qualifier – First Round

1990 FIFA World Cup Qualifier – First Round

1990 FIFA World Cup Qualifier – First Round

1989 Peace and Friendship Cup – Preliminary Round

1989 Peace and Friendship Cup – Preliminary Round

1989 Peace and Friendship Cup – Preliminary Round

1989 Peace and Friendship Cup – Semifinal

1989 Peace and Friendship Cup – 3rd Place Match

Statistics

Results by year

Managers

Opponents

External links
 www.teammelli.com
 www.fifa.com

1980
1980s in Iran
1980–81 in Iranian football
1981–82 in Iranian football
1982–83 in Iranian football
1984–85 in Iranian football
1985–86 in Iranian football
1986–87 in Iranian football
1987–88 in Iranian football
1988–89 in Iranian football
1989–90 in Iranian football
1980s in Iranian sport